Samuel Louis Joseph (born May 10, 1983) is the running backs coach for the Nicholls Colonels football team.

Playing career
Joseph played college football at Colorado in 2003 and at LSU from 2005 to 2006 after transferring and sitting out the 2004 season. He was signed by the San Francisco 49ers as an undrafted free agent in 2007. From 2009 to 2010, Joseph played defensive back in the Canadian Football League for the Toronto Argonauts.

Coaching career
Joseph began his coaching career as a strength and conditioning intern at LSU from 2014 to 2015. He spent the 2017 season at St. Michael's Catholic Academy as the head strength and conditioning coach. In 2018, Joseph became the running backs coach for the Nicholls Colonels football team.

Personal life
Joseph's older brother, Vance, was a quarterback and running back for the Colorado Buffaloes from 1990 to 1995. Vance was hired as head coach of the Denver Broncos on January 11, 2017, after signing a four-year contract. He coached the Broncos through the 2018 season. Joseph's other older brother, Mickey, played quarterback for the Nebraska Cornhuskers and is the current interim head coach.

References

External links
LSU Tigers bio
Toronto Argonauts bio

1983 births
Living people
American players of Canadian football
American football defensive backs
Archbishop Shaw High School alumni
Canadian football defensive backs
Players of American football from Louisiana
LSU Tigers football players
San Francisco 49ers players
Toronto Argonauts players
LSU Tigers football coaches
Nicholls Colonels football coaches
People from Marrero, Louisiana